So Fresh: The Hits of Spring 2006 is part of the So Fresh album series. It was released in Australia on 18 September 2006.

Track listing
Shakira featuring Wyclef Jean – "Hips Don't Lie" (3:38)
Christina Aguilera – "Ain't No Other Man" (3:48)
Rihanna – "Unfaithful" (3:47)
Stephanie McIntosh – "Mistake" (3:20)
Nick Lachey – "What's Left of Me" (4:05)
Pink – "Who Knew" (3:28)
The Pussycat Dolls featuring Snoop Dogg – "Buttons" (3:53)
Beyoncé – "Déjà Vu" (3:24)
Ne-Yo – "Sexy Love" (3:40)
Jessica Simpson – "A Public Affair" (3:21)
Shannon Noll – "Lonely" (4:43)
Keane – "Is It Any Wonder?" (3:05)
Sandi Thom – "I Wish I Was a Punk Rocker (With Flowers in My Hair)" (2:33)
The Fray – "Over My Head (Cable Car)" (3:57)
Teddy Geiger – "For You I Will (Confidence)" (3:49)
Nickelback – "Animals" (3:05)
Bernard Fanning – "Watch Over Me" (3:31)
Snow Patrol – "You're All I Have" (4:32)
The All-American Rejects – "Move Along" (3:57)
The Grates – "19-20-20" (2:04)
Paulini – "I Believe" (3:13)
Nelly featuring Paul Wall and Ali & Gipp – "Grillz" (3:47)

Charts

See also
 So Fresh
 2006 in music

References

External links
 Official site

So Fresh albums
2006 compilation albums
2006 in Australian music